Cala Llucalari is a small bay and beach at Menorca's southern coast located in a natural preserve. The beach is sparsely visited, despite the highly developed Son Bou resort beach town nearby. The Camí de Cavalls passes just behind the bay.

References 

Geography of Menorca